The D.I.C.E. Award for Role-Playing Game of the Year is an award presented annually by the Academy of Interactive Arts & Sciences during the academy's annual D.I.C.E. Awards. "This award honors a title, single-player or multi-player, where an individual assumes the role of one or more characters and develops those characters in terms of abilities, statistics, and/or traits as the game progresses. Gameplay involves exploring, acquiring resources, solving puzzles, and interacting with player or non-player characters in the persistent world. Through the player's actions, his/her virtual characters' statistics or traits demonstrably evolve throughout the game." The award initially had separate awards for console action games and computer games at the 1st Annual Interactive Achievement Awards in 1998 with the first winners being Final Fantasy VII for console and Dungeon Keeper for computer. There have been numerous mergers, additions of role-playing related games. The current version was established at the 21st Annual D.I.C.E. Awards in 2018, which was awarded to Nier: Automata.

The award's most recent winner is Elden Ring developed by FromSoftware and published by Bandai Namco Entertainment.

History 

Initially the Interactive Achievement Awards had separate awards for Console Role Playing Game of the Year and Computer Role-Playing Game of the Year. The Role-Playing Game category was merged with the Adventure game category at the 2000 awards. This was probably because the previous console adventure game winners also won the award for console role-playing, which were Final Fantasy VII in 1998 and The Legend of Zelda: Ocarina of Time in 1999. The following year the Adventure Game categories were merged with Action Game categories, so separate awards for Role-Playing Games resumed. Starting in 2005, genre-specific awards would no longer have separate awards for console and computer games. So there would be just one Role-Playing Game of the Year award. In 2010, Role-Playing Game of the Year was merged with Massively Multiplayer Game of the Year, since the most Massively multiplayer online games were MMORPGs. The award would be simplified back to Role-Playing Game of the Year in 2018.
Console Role-Playing Game of the Year (1998—1999)
Computer Role-Playing Game of the Year (1998—1999)
Console Adventure/Role-Playing Game of the Year (2000)
Computer Adventure/Role-Playing Game of the Year (2000)
Console Role-Playing Game of the Year (2001—2005)
Computer Role-Playing Game of the Year (2001—2005)
Role-Playing Game of the Year (2006—2009)
Role-Playing/Massively Multiplayer Game of the Year (2010—2012)
Role-Playing/Massively Multiplayer Game of the Year (2013—2017)
Role-Playing Game of the Year (2018—present)

Winners and nominees

1990s

2000s

2010s

2020s

Multiple nominations and wins

Developers and publishers 
Square Enix has the most nominations as a publisher, which includes the nominations prior to the merge between SquareSoft and Enix. Electronic Arts has published the most award winners for RPG awards, which included the titles they helped SquareSoft publish prior to the merge with Enix. The combined nominations of SquareSoft and Square Enix as a developer, is tied with BioWare for the most nominations. BioWare has developed the most the award winners. Level-5 has received the most nominations as a developer, without winning a single award. Sega has published the nominees without having won a single award.

BioWare, SquareSoft and Square Enix are the only developers to have consecutive wins for RPG awards.
SqaureSoft, Square Enix, and Electronic Arts, are the only publishers with back-to-back wins for RPG awards.
 SquareSoft won Console Role-Playing Game of the Year in 2000 with Final Fantasy VIII and 2001 with Final Fantasy XI. Both of which published by Square Electronic Arts, a subsidiary of EA that was part of partnership with SquareSoft.
 BioWare won Computer Role-Playing Game of the Year four years in row from 2002—2005, and technically won a fifth year, winning Role-Playing Game of the Year in 2006.
Baldur's Gate II: Throne of Bhaal (2002)
Neverwinter Nights (2003)
Star Wars: Knights of the Old Republic (2004)
Neverwinter Nights: Kingmaker (2005)
Jade Empire (2006)
 BioWare, now owned by Electronic Arts, won Role-Playing Game of the Year back-to-back again in 2010 with Dragon Age: Origins and in 2011 with Mass Effect 2.
 Square Enix also won Role-Playing Game of the Year back-to-back again in 2021 with Final Fantasy VII Remake and in 2022 with Final Fantasy XIV: Endwalker.

In 2003, BioWare became the only developer to win both Console Role-Playing Game of the Year and Computer Role-Playing Game of the Year in the same year with Star Wars: Knights of the Old Republic, which was published by LucasArts. Black Isle Studios also published the winners for console and computer RPGs in 2002, but with developers. Baldur's Gate: Dark Alliance for console, developed by Snowblind Studios, and Baldur's Gate II: Throne of Bhaal for computer, developed by BioWare.

Franchises 
The Final Fantasy franchise has been the most nominated franchise and has won the most awards. Deus Ex and Pokémon have received the most nominations without won a single award. Mass Effect and Dragon Age have won every single time they have been nominated.
Final Fantasy is also the only franchise to have received with back-to-back wins for RPG awards:
 Final Fantasy VIII and Final Fantasy XI won Console Role-Playing Game of the Year in 2000 and 2001
 Final Fantasy VII Remake and Final Fantasy XIV: Endwalker won  in 2021 and 2022.
There were numerous games that received multiple nominations, mostly for expansion packs.
 Diablo II won Computer Role-Playing Game of the Year in 2001 and the expansion pack Lord of Destruction was nominated in 2002.
 Baldur's Gate II: Shadows of Amn was nominated for Computer Role-Playing Game of the Year 2001 and the expansion Throne of Bhaal won in 2002 for Computer Role-Playing Game of the Year.
 Neverwinter Nights won Computer Role-Playing Game of the Year 2003, the expansion pack Shadows of Undrentide was nominated in 2004, and the expansion pack Kingmaker won 2005.
 World of Warcraft expansion packs that have been nominated have been Cataclysm in 14th Annual Interactive Achievement Awards, Warlords of Draenor in 2015, and Legion in 2017.
 Diablo III was nominated in 2013 and won 2014
 Final Fantasy XIV expansion packs Shadowbringers was nominated in 2019 and Endwalker won in 2022.Star Wars: Knights of the Old Republic was the only game to win both console and computer RPG awards in the same year in 2004. Baldur's Gate was the only franchise to be nominated for and win both console and computer awards with different games in 2002, with Baldur's Gate: Dark Alliance for console and the Baldur's Gate II: Throne of Bhaal'' expansion pack for computer.

Notes

References 

D.I.C.E. Awards
Awards established in 1998
Awards for best video game